480 Queen Street is a  premium grade office tower in Brisbane, Australia located at 480 Queen Street in the Brisbane central business district's golden triangle. The project was designed by BVN Architecture and developed and constructed by Grocon, in partnership with Dexus Property Group.

A key design feature is a  area known as Hobbs Park with river views on level four, open to all tenants and the public. As well as adding to the amenity for tenants, it makes a significant community contribution by preserving the river views from the St John's Cathedral grounds.

It is intended to be 6-star Green Star and 5-star NABERS rated. 480 Queen Street has achieved early leasing success with 80 per cent of the building's  of office space leased to BHP, HWL Ebsworth, Herbert Smith Freehills, Allens, DLA Piper, PriceWaterhouseCoopers and Regus.

480 Queen Street is Grocon's third Brisbane construction project and follows the Common Ground affordable housing project in Hope Street, South Brisbane and an office building for the Australian Tax Office in 55 Elizabeth Street.

History
The building was approved for development by the Brisbane City Council in September 2012.

Building construction began in April 2013 and was due for completion by early 2016.

Tenants
 BHP
 PricewaterhouseCoopers
 HWL Ebsworth
 Herbert Smith Freehills
 Allens
 DLA Piper
 F1rst Class Fitness
 Jimmy Rods Shave Saloon
 Juniper Networks
 Necta Espresso
 Terra Firma
 Regus

See also

 List of tallest buildings in Brisbane

References

External links

 Building at Grocon webpage
 Building at The Skyscraper Center database

Skyscrapers in Brisbane
Office buildings in Brisbane
Postmodern architecture
Queen Street, Brisbane
2015 establishments in Australia
Skyscraper office buildings in Australia
Retail buildings in Queensland
Office buildings completed in 2015